Isfrid of Ratzeburg was a Premonstratensian Prince-Bishop of Ratzeburg.

Religious life
Isfrid was a professed canon of the Cappenberg monastery in Westphalia. In 1159, Isfrid was appointed the Provost of Jerichow. There he finished construction of the  Romanesque collegiate church of St. Mary and St. Nicholas. In 1179, he succeeded Evermode of Ratzeburg as third bishop of Ratzeburg. He was known for his organizational skills and created many parishes.

He was responsible for the restoration of the monastery of Floreffe, near Namur, which had been destroyed by fire. According to Arnold of Lübeck, he succeeded in recalling all the canons that had been scattered in all directions over the past year and a half. He then consecrated the collegiate church of Postel in Belgium, then under the jurisdiction of Floreffe. The ancient annals of Stederburg present him as a man exalted for Christian wisdom, humility and fortitude. Many miracles are associated with Isfrid's life.

He died on 15 June 1204, the day on which his memory is celebrated. In the diocese of Osnabruck he enjoyed an ancient cult, confirmed in 1725 by Pope Benedict XIII to the Order of Premonstratensians. He is depicted as a bishop, with water that turned into wine and with a blind man that he healed.

References

|-

German Roman Catholic saints
13th-century Christian saints
1204 deaths
13th-century German Roman Catholic bishops
Premonstratensians
Roman Catholic Prince-Bishops of Ratzeburg
Year of birth unknown
12th-century German Roman Catholic bishops
Beatifications by Pope Benedict XIII